Álvaro Sánchez Alfaro (born August 2, 1984 in Ciudad Quesada) is a Costa Rican footballer who currently plays for Municipal Grecia.

Career

Club
Before he signed for Alajuelense, Sánchez had been a member of the Primera División de Costa Rica team San Carlos for whom he made his debut on 7 March 2007. He signed on loan with Major League Soccer side FC Dallas in March 2009.

He joined Liga in summer 2012.

International
Sánchez appeared in 4 games, scoring 2 goals, with the Costa Rica national football team at the UNCAF Nations Cup 2009. He made his debut for the senior side in the first match of the tournament against Panama, following an injury to teammate Yosimar Arias.

International goals

References

External links

1984 births
Living people
People from San Carlos (canton)
Association football midfielders
Costa Rican footballers
Costa Rica international footballers
2009 UNCAF Nations Cup players
A.D. San Carlos footballers
FC Dallas players
L.D. Alajuelense footballers
C.S. Cartaginés players
A.D. Carmelita footballers
Deportivo Saprissa players
Municipal Pérez Zeledón footballers
Municipal Grecia players
Costa Rican expatriate footballers
Expatriate soccer players in the United States
Costa Rican expatriate sportspeople in the United States
Liga FPD players
Major League Soccer players